Pat Quinn is an Australian former professional rugby league footballer who played in the 1940s.

Playing career

Pat Quinn was a St. George Dragons junior, during the war years. His position was usually , although he often played  when Ted McHugh was in the side. After two years at the Dragons, during the last years of the War, Quinn moved to the Eastern Suburbs club in 1947 but played mostly in Reserve Grade, and often on the wing.

References

External links
East Promotes Quinn; Quinlivan Hurt

Australian rugby league players
Living people
Place of birth missing (living people)
Rugby league fullbacks
Rugby league wingers
St. George Dragons players
Sydney Roosters players
Year of birth missing (living people)